Politzariella is a genus of moths in the family Cossidae. It contains only one species, Politzariella pantherina, which is found in Burkina Faso.

References

External links
Natural History Museum Lepidoptera generic names catalog

Politzariellinae
Monotypic moth genera
Cossidae genera
Moths of Africa